The 166th Pennsylvania House of Representatives District is in South Eastern Pennsylvania and has been represented by Greg Vitali since 1993.

District profile
The 166th Pennsylvania House of Representatives District is located in Delaware County and Montgomery County and includes the following areas:

 Delaware County
 Haverford Township (PART, Wards 02, 03, 04, 05, 06, 07 and 08)
 Radnor Township (PART)
 Ward 01 [PART, Division 02]
 Ward 02
 Ward 03 [PART, Division 02]
 Ward 05 [PART, Division 01]
 Ward 07
 Montgomery County 
 Lower Merion Township (PART)
 Ward 04
 Ward 08
 Ward 10 [PART, Division 03]

Representatives

Recent election results

References

External links
District map from the United States Census Bureau
Pennsylvania House Legislative District Maps from the Pennsylvania Redistricting Commission.  
Population Data for District 44 from the Pennsylvania Redistricting Commission.

Government of Delaware County, Pennsylvania
Government of Montgomery County, Pennsylvania
166